Odontobutis potamophila is a species of freshwater sleeper native to China and Vietnam, is a commercially important fish species used in aquaculture in China.

References

Fish of Southeast Asia
Freshwater fish of China
Odontobutis
Fish described in 1861
Taxa named by Albert Günther